Hemiberlesia is a genus of scales and mealybugs in the family Diaspididae. There are at least 30 described species in Hemiberlesia.

Species

References

Further reading

 
 
 
 

Aspidiotina
Sternorrhyncha genera